Second Skin is a remix album by Australian musicians John Course & mrTimothy, best known for their Ministry Of Sound compilations. The album, featuring Katie Noonan's vocals, is a remix project from her 2007 album Skin.

Noonan says: "The dance album project Second Skin was another fun element to this album – the chance to explore these tunes well and truly out of their comfort zone in the dance world – and for me to re-record all the lead vocals (in a day!)"

The album debuted and peaked at number 19 on ARIA Dance Chart on 28 April 2008.

Reviews
Pete Dillon of SameSame said; "With programming/mixing from Mr Timothy and John Course, Noonan’s beautifully feminine voice sits fabulously over some acoustic and electric guitar sounds and some wicked dance beats. With a sound similar to Morcheeba and Moloko, this is the music you want on when you are zipping around the house with a dust cloth or mop. It has been spinning while I have entertained dinner guests and works just as nicely." Adding "This is a highly recommended disc and one that should be in all those collections that have some great vocally based funky electro sounds."

Waterfront said: "John Course and MrTimothy have captured the sensual and uplifting essence of Skin while introducing a house, funk beat - and the result is the refreshingly ambient remixed album."

Track listing
 "Who Are You?"  (Electro Funk Lovers Mix)  - 5:36
 "Logic"  (Electro Funk Lovers Mix)  - 5:20
 "Time to Begin"  (Electro Funk Lovers Mix)  - 5:19
 "One Step"  (Electro Funk Lovers Mix)  - 4:11
 "Love's My Song for You"  (Electro Funk Lovers Mix)  - 4:20
 "Return"  (Electro Funk Lovers Mix)  - 3:58
 "A Little Smile"  (Electro Funk Lovers Mix)  - 4:23
 "Bluebird"  (Electro Funk Lovers Mix)  - 6:05
 "Little Boy Man"  (Electro Funk Lovers Mix)  - 3:04
 "Sunshine"  (Electro Funk Lovers Mix)  - 4:44
 "Home" (Electro Funk Lovers Mix)  - 4:57
 "Send Out a Little Man" (Electro Funk Lovers Mix)  - 3:50

Release history

References

External links
 "Second Skin" by John Course & mrTimothy Present Katie Noonanat Discogs

2008 remix albums
Katie Noonan albums
Remix albums by Australian artists
Warner Music Australasia albums